Thiri Thudhamma Yaza (8 April 1561 – c. May 1584) was viceroy of Martaban (Mottama) from 1581 to 1584. He was the younger brother of King Nawrahta Minsaw of Lan Na and Princess Yaza Datu Kalaya.

Brief
The future viceroy was born Thinga Dathta to Queen Yaza Dewi and King Bayinnaung of Toungoo Dynasty on 8 April 1561 at the Kanbawzathadi Palace. The youngest of the king's six children by his three principal queens grew up at the palace. He had his royal hair-knotting ceremony on 20 October 1577.

He commanded a regiment in the 1579–80 campaign to Lan Xang under the overall commander-in-chief Nanda. The 22,000-strong army saw no action there.

He was appointed viceroy of Martaban (Mottama) with the style of Thiri Thudhamma Yaza on 26 May 1581. The new viceroy was asked to co-lead, along with Minye Kyawhtin, the ongoing war with Arakan. On 28 September 1581, his army of 18,000 men, 800 horses, 60 elephants left Pegu for Arakan. (Minye Kyawhtin led an 11,000-strong army.) But neither man saw any action. The king died six weeks later, and the new king Nanda called off the invasion.

It was the last time he was explicitly mentioned by name in the Burmese chronicles. In May 1584, Martaban was under occupation of Crown Prince Naresuan of Siam, who returned to Siam by taking away many conscripts to Siam. The viceroy might have been taken away or killed. Pegu's forces reoccupied Martaban in the same year but the viceroy's name or the term "viceroy of Martaban" (မုတ္တမ မင်းကြီး) never came up again. Although three of the five Burmese invasions of Siam (1584–1593) went through Martaban, neither his name nor the ruler of Martaban is ever mentioned in any of the commander lists of the campaigns. When the ruler of the Martaban is mentioned in the Siam's 1592 raid into Martaban's territory, he is referred to as governor of Martaban (မုတ္တမ မြို့စား).

Notes

References

Bibliography
 
 

First Toungoo Empire
1561 births
1584 deaths